The 1921 Detroit Junior College football team represented Detroit Junior College (later renamed Wayne State University) as an independent during the 1921 college football season. In their fourth year under head coach David L. Holmes, the Detroit team compiled a 6–0–2 record, did not allow any of its opponents to score, and outscored all opponents by a combined total of 165 to 0.

The season opener against Assumption College was played in Canada at Sandwich. The Central Michigan game was played on Thanksgiving Day at Grindley Field in Detroit.

On December 9, 1921, the student council held a banquet and dance in honor of the football team for having not allowed a point to be scored against them during the 1921 season.

Hazen Dever was the team captain. Other players included Cameron Cunningham, Jack Duncan, Newman Ertell, Norm Heym, Raymond Humphrey, Harold Grant Iler, Russell Lightbody, Thomas MacKay, and M. Cole Seager, and players with the surnames Allen, Becklein, Boyd, Breslin, Grant, Grove, Johnson, Monihan, Plauman, and Richards. Frank Olney was the manager.

Schedule

References

Detroit Junior College
Wayne State Warriors football seasons
College football undefeated seasons
Detroit Junior College football